Whiskeytown Dam (officially Clair A. Hill Whiskeytown Dam) is an earthfill dam on Clear Creek, a tributary of the Sacramento River of northern California in the United States.

History 
The dam was one of the first units built of the Trinity River Division of the Central Valley Project, a federal water project intended to provide irrigation water to the eponymous Central Valley. Construction started in August 1960 with clearing operations around the dam site, and excavations for the spillway and outlet tunnels began in October. By late 1961, over one-half of the dam embankment was complete. The dam was topped out on February 7, 1963, and the reservoir was allowed to begin filling. On September 28, it was dedicated by President John F. Kennedy to a crowd of more than 10,000 people.

Water diverted from the Trinity River through the  Clear Creek Tunnel is stored behind Whiskeytown Dam before it is released into the Sacramento River. The water is released to the Sacramento through lower Clear Creek and the Spring Creek Tunnel. The latter furnishes water to the 180 megawatt (MW) Spring Creek Powerplant, which generates about 274 million kilowatt hours (KWh) annually.  

In addition, there is a 3.5 MW Power Plant at the base of Whiskeytown dam built in 1986 by the city of Redding.    This power plant generates power through the flows that were previously released down Clear Creek through the project's river outlets.

The lake and dam are named after the Gold Rush camp of Whiskeytown, which was submerged in 1963 with the filling of the new reservoir.

See also
Lewiston Dam
List of dams and reservoirs in California
List of United States Bureau of Reclamation dams
Spring Creek Dam
Trinity Dam
Whiskeytown-Shasta-Trinity National Recreation Area

References

External links
Daily water levels for Whiskeytown Lake

Dams in California
United States Bureau of Reclamation dams
Dams completed in 1963
Embankment dams
Dams in the Sacramento River basin
Central Valley Project
1963 establishments in California